The Naqqal are a Muslim community found in the state of Uttar Pradesh and Delhi in India. They are also known as the Kashmiri Bhand and recently as Kashmiri Shaikh. The Naqqal are a sub-group within the larger Bhand community.

Origin
The Naqqal literally means mimicry in the Urdu language, and the Naqqal get their name from the fact they were mimics at the court of the Nawabs of Awadh.Their mother tongue is Urdu. According to some traditions, they are a branch of the Mirasi community, while others consider them to be a sub-group of the Bhand community. They were invited by Nawab Nasir-ud-din Haider of Awadh from Kashmir. Most trace their descent from Ali Jan who arrived from Kashmir, and served at the court of Wajid Ali Shah. His descendants kept the tradition of mimicry, entertaining the taluqdars of Awadh.

Present circumstances
The Naqqal are distributed in the old parts of Lucknow city. They now speak Urdu and Awadhi, and dislike the use of the word Naqqal, claiming to be Shaikh. They are strictly endogamous, marrying close kin, and practice both cross cousin and parallel cousin marriages. The community have no system of exogamous clans.

The traditional occupation of the Naqqal was mimicry (as bahrupiyas), but like other guild based castes, they have seen a decline in their traditional occupation.  Most Naqqal have now taking up shop keeping and peddling, while some are now wage labourers. They are in the process of acquiring a new identity as Kashmiri Shaikh, and this has meant the progressive abandonment of their traditionally occupation. It is quite possible that if they succeed, the Naqqal name will be consigned to history. The Naqqal are Shia, and their customs are similar to other Muslim communities in the city of Lucknow.

See also
Kashmiri Shaikh
Behrupiya

References

Social groups of Uttar Pradesh
Muslim communities of Uttar Pradesh
Muslim communities of India